The 2009 Alberta Scotties Tournament of Hearts, Alberta's women's provincial curling championship, was held January 28 - February 1 at the Medican Multiplex in Sylvan Lake. The winning Cheryl Bernard team represented team Alberta at the 2009 Scotties Tournament of Hearts in Victoria, British Columbia.

Teams

Draw Brackets

A Event

B Event

C Event

Results

Draw 1
January 28, 1300

Draw 2
January 28, 1830

Draw 3
January 29, 0830

Draw 4
January 28, 1330

Draw 5
January 29, 1830

Draw 6
January 30, 0830

Draw 7
January 30, 1330

Draw 8
January 30, 1830

Draw 9
January 31, 1300

Playoffs

C1 vs. C2
January 31, 1830

A vs. B
January 31, 1830

Semi-final
February 1, 0930

Final
February 1, 1400

Alberta
Curling competitions in Alberta
2009 in Alberta
January 2009 sports events in Canada
February 2009 sports events in Canada